Cistercian nuns are female members of the Cistercian Order, a religious order belonging to the Roman Catholic branch of the Catholic Church.

History
The first Cistercian monastery for women, Le Tart Abbey, was established at Tart-l'Abbaye in the Diocese of Langres (now Dijon), in 1125, by nuns from the Benedictine monastery of Juilly, and with the co-operation of Stephen Harding, abbot of Cîteaux. At Juilly, a dependence of Molesme Abbey, Humbeline, the sister of Bernard of Clairvaux, lived and died.

The Cistercian nuns of Le Tart founded successively Ferraque (1140) in the Diocese of Noyon, Blandecques (1153) in the Diocese of St-Omer, and Montreuil-les-Dames (1164) near Laon. In Spain the first Cistercian monastery of women was that of Tulebras (1134) in the Kingdom of Navarre. Then came Santa María la Real de las Huelgas (Valladolid) (1140), Espírito Santo Olmedo (1142), Villabona, or San Miguel de las  Dueñas (1155), Perales (1160), Gradefes (1168), Cañas (1169) and others. The most celebrated was Santa María la Real de Las Huelgas near Burgos, founded in 1187 by Alfonso VIII of Castile. The observance was established there by Cistercian nuns who came from Tulebras, under the guidance of Misol, who became its first abbess. The second abbess was Constance, daughter of the founder, who believed she had the power of preaching in her church and hearing confessions of her religious. In the following year, 1190, the eighteen abbesses of France held their first general chapter at Tart. The abbesses of France and Spain themselves made the regular visits to their houses of filiation. The Council of Trent, by its decrees regarding the cloister of nuns, put an end to the chapter and the visits.

In Italy, in 1171, were founded the monasteries of Santa Lucia at Syracuse, San Michele at Ivrea, and that of Conversano, the only one in the peninsula in which the abbesses carry a crosier. A century later the Cistercian nuns had established houses in Switzerland, Germany (St. Marienthal Abbey in 1234), and Flanders.

The decline which manifested itself in the communities of monks of the Cistercian Order towards the middle of the fourteenth century was felt also in the monasteries of nuns. It was at this time that the Conceptionist Order was founded in Toledo, Spain, by Beatrice of Silva. Her nuns were quick to abandon the Cistercian Rule for that of the Poor Clares. In France Jeanne de Courcelles de Pourlan, having been elected Abbess of Tart in 1617, restored the regular discipline in her community, which was transferred to Dijon in 1625. Owing to the hostility of the Abbot of Cîteaux to the reform Abbess de Pourlan had the Holy See withdraw her abbey from the jurisdiction of the Order of Cîteaux. In 1602, another reform was effected at Port-Royal des Champs by Angélique Arnauld, who, to provide for the ever-increasing members of the community, founded Port-Royal de Paris, in the Faubourg of Saint-Jacques (1622). Queen Marie de Medicis declared herself protectress of this institution, and Pope Urban VIII exempted it from the jurisdiction of the Abbot of Cîteaux, placing it under that of Paris. The religious of Port-Royal de Paris and of Port-Royal des Champs ended by consecrating themselves to the adoration of the Blessed Sacrament. However, the vicinity of the Abbé de Saint-Cyran became dangerous for them, and they saw the suppression and destruction of Port-Royal des Champs by order of the Louis XIV in 1710, while they themselves were dispersed. The property and abbatial titles were annexed to Port-Royal de Paris, which subsisted up to the time of the French Revolution, before being transformed first into a prison, and then into a maternity hospital.

After the French Revolution another reform took place. Dom Augustin de Lestrange gathered the scattered Cistercian nuns of France, with members of other orders that had been equally dispersed, and reconstructed the Cistercian Sisterhood. In 1795, he gave them a monastery which he called the Holy Will of God (La Sainte-Volonté de Dieu), situated in the Bas-Valais, Switzerland. The Trappistines, for so the new religious were called, were obliged to leave Switzerland in 1798. They followed the Trappist monks in their travels over Europe, returned to Switzerland in 1803, and remained there until 1816, when at length they were able to return to France and take up their abode at Forges, near La Trappe. Two years later they occupied an old monastery of the Augustinians at Les Gardes, in the Diocese of Angers. The Trappistines spread  over France, and into other countries of Europe. Since the reunion of the three congregations of La Trappe, in 1892, they have been officially entitled Reformed Cistercians of the Strict Observance.

In North America

A Cistercian novice who came from Europe at the same time as the Trappists, and who was joined by seventeen women from the United States, tried to establish a community, but circumstances prevented its success. Father Vincent de Paul (born Jacques Merle, 1769–1853), at Tracadie, Nova Scotia, having asked the Congregation of Notre Dame of Montreal for three sisters to help him with his mission in Nova Scotia, established them there and, after probation, admitted them to the profession of simple vows of the Third Order of La Trappe. However, the community never in reality formed a part of the Order of Cîteaux nor wore the Cistercian habit.

The Monastery of Our Lady of Good Counsel, at Saint-Romuald near Quebec City, the first genuine community of Cistercian nuns in America, was established in 1902 by Mother Lutgarde, Prioress of Bonneval, France, when on 21 November 1902, she brought a small colony of religious women. On 29 July of the following year Mgr. Marois, as delegate of the Archbishop of Quebec, blessed the new monastery. The means of subsistence for this house were agricultural labour and the manufacture of chocolate. The community was under the direction of the Archbishop of Quebec. Another, Notre-Dame de l'Assomption Abbey at Rogersville, New Brunswick, where there were already some Cistercian monks, was established by the sisters expelled by the French Government from their Monastery of Vaise, at Lyon.

Monasteries of Cistercian nuns of the Strict Observance

Africa

Angola: Huambo, Luanda
Benin: Parakou
Cameroon:Obout
Democratic Republic of the Congo: Kinshasa
Madagascar: Ampibanjinana
Nigeria: Abakaliki
Rwanda: Cyangugu, Kibungo
Uganda: Masaka

Asia

India: Kerala
Indonesia: Salatiga
Japan: Ajimu, Hakodate, Imari, Nishinomiya, Tochigi
Philippines: South Cotabato 
South Korea: Kyongnam
Syria: Midan-Aleppo

Europe

There are numerous monasteries scattered throughout Europe, with France having the largest number.

Belgium: Bocholt, Bouillon, Brecht, Chimay, Fleurus and Tilff
Czech Republic: Neveklov, Porta coeli Convent in Předklášteří
France: Anduze, Arcis-le-Ponsart, Auros, Bernardvillé, Blauvac, Campénéac, Charmes, Échourgnac, Laval, Le Cayrol, Meymac, Roybon, St-Georges-des-Gardes and Troisvaux
Germany: Dahlem, Donnersberg, St. Marienthal Abbey in Ostritz
Hungary: Érd, Kismaros
Ireland: Lismore
Italy: Pisa, Rome and Vitorchiano
Netherlands: Arnhem
Norway: Tautra Abbey
Portugal: Mnastery of São Bento da Porta Aberta
Spain: Alloz-Estella, Arévalo, Armenteira, Arnedo, Avila, Benaguasil, Burgos (Las Huelgas), Cañas, Carrizo de La Ribera, Cartagena, San Andrés de Arroyo and Tulebras
Switzerland: Romont and Sierre
United Kingdom: Holy Cross Abbey, Whitland in Wales

Latin America

Argentina: Hinojo
Brazil: Boa Vista 
Chile: Curicó
Ecuador: Esmeraldas
Mexico: Ciudad Hidalgo
Nicaragua: Santo Tomas-Chontales
Venezuela: El Tocuyo

North America

Canada: Rogersville, NB and Saint-Benoît-Labre, Quebec
USA: Crozet VA, Dubuque IA, Sonoita AZ, Whitethorn CA, and Wrentham, MA

See also
 Bernardines
:Category:Cistercian nuns

References

Ghislain Baury, "Emules puis sujettes de l'Ordre cistercien. Les cisterciennes de Castille et d'ailleurs face au Chapitre Général aux XIIe et XIIIe siècles", Cîteaux: commentarii cistercienses, t. 52, fasc. 1-2 (2001), p. 27-60.
Ghislain Baury, Les religieuses de Castille. Patronage aristocratique et ordre cistercien, XIIe-XIIIe siècles, Rennes, Presses Universitaires de Rennes, 2012.
Hélyot, Dictionnaire des ordres religieux;
Gaillardin, Histoire de La Trappe;
L'Abbaye de N.D. du Lac et l'ordre de Cîteaux au Canada et dans les États-Unis.

Notes

Attribution

 
 
Catholic female orders and societies